The Asian Taekwondo Championships are the Asian senior championships in Taekwondo, first held in South Korea in 1973. The event is held every two years and is organized by the Asian Taekwondo Union, the continental affiliate of World Taekwondo, which organises and controls Olympic style taekwondo.

Competitions

All-time medal table
All-time medal count, as of the 2022 Asian Taekwondo Championships.

Team ranking

References

External links
 Official site of the Asian Taekwondo Union

 
Recurring sporting events established in 1974
Taekwondo
Taekwondo competitions
Taekwondo in Asia